Nicholas II was Greek Patriarch of Alexandria (1263–76). Before his ordination, he had been the Ambassador of the Sultan of Egypt in Constantinople.

References

13th-century Patriarchs of Alexandria